John B. Broom (born August 29, 1922) was a professional baseball left fielder in the Negro leagues. He played with the New York Black Yankees in 1947.

References

External links
 and Seamheads

New York Black Yankees players
Baseball players from Florida
People from Tampa, Florida
1922 births
Year of death missing
Baseball outfielders